The following are events related to Canadian soccer in the year 2023.

National teams

Men’s

Senior

Friendlies

CONCACAF Nations League

Group C

U-17

2023 CONCACAF U-17 Championship

Group F

Knockout stage

Women’s

Senior 

.

Friendlies

SheBelieves Cup

2023 FIFA Women's World Cup

Group B

2024 Summer Olympics – Women's qualification (CONCACAF play-off)

Club competitions

Men’s

Domestic leagues

Canadian Premier League

Regular season

International leagues

Major League Soccer

CONCACAF Champions League

Round of 16

|}
Notes

Quarter-finals

|}

Leagues Cup

Group stage

West

East

Notes

References

External links 
 Canadian Soccer Association
 CONCACAF
 FIFA
 MLS

2023 in Canadian soccer
Seasons in Canadian soccer
2023 sport-related lists